George Ashe or Ash may refer to:

 George Ashe (Canadian politician) (1932–2014), politician in Ontario, Canada
 George T. Ashe (1905–1975), politician in the Massachusetts House of Representatives and mayor of Lowell, Massachusetts
 George Ash (Australian politician) (1859–1897), newspaper editor, lawyer and parliamentarian in colonial South Australia

See also
 Saint-George Ashe (1871–1922), British rower
 St George Ashe (1658–1718), Church of Ireland cleric